
Year 637 (DCXXXVII) was a common year starting on Wednesday (link will display the full calendar) of the Julian calendar. The denomination 637 for this year has been used since the early medieval period, when the Anno Domini calendar era became the prevalent method in Europe for naming years.

Events 
 By place 
 Britain 
 June 24 – Battle of Mag Rath: King Oswald of Northumbria sends troops to Ireland, to assist Domnall Brecc King of Dál Riata in his alliance with King Congal Cáech of Ulaid against Domnall mac Áedo High King of Ireland, during the Irish dynastic wars. Domnall Brecc, Congal and their forces are defeated near Moira. At the Mull of Kintyre (southwest Scotland), Domnall mac Áedo's fleet destroys Domnall Brecc's naval force of Dál Riata.

 Persia 
 March – Siege of Ctesiphon: The Rashidun army (15,000 men) under Saʿd ibn Abi Waqqas occupies the Persian capital of Ctesiphon, after a two-month siege. King Yazdegerd III flees with the imperial treasure eastward into Media. Muslim forces conquer the Persian provinces as far as Khuzestan (modern Iran). 
 Battle of Jalula: Muslim Arabs defeat the Persian forces (20,000 men) under Farrukhzad at the Diyala River. The cities Tikrit and Mosul are captured, completing the conquest of Mesopotamia. The region west of the Zagros Mountains is annexed by the Rashidun Caliphate.

 Arabian Empire 
 April – Siege of Jerusalem: The Rashidun army (20,000 men), led by 'Amr ibn al-'As, conquers Jerusalem after a six-month siege. The Byzantine garrison surrenders to Caliph Umar I, who is invited by Sophronius, patriarch of Jerusalem, to pray in the Church of the Holy Sepulchre. Umar declines, fearing that accepting the invitation might endanger the church's status, and turn the Christian holy site into a mosque.
 Battle of Hazir: Muslim Arab forces (17,000 men) under Khalid ibn al-Walid defeat the Byzantine army near Qinnasrin (Northern Syria). The cities of Beirut and Tyre are captured by Yazid ibn Abi Sufyan after a short siege. 
 October – Siege of Aleppo: Muslim Arabs under Khalid ibn al-Walid conquer the Byzantine stronghold Aleppo; the large walled city surrenders after a four-month siege. A column of troops under Malik al-Ashtar is sent to take Azaz.
 Battle of the Iron Bridge: Rashidun forces under Khalid ibn al-Walid defeat the Byzantine army and Christian Arabs near Antioch, at the Orontes River. It marks the complete annexation of Syria into the Rashidun Caliphate.

 Asia 
 Chang'an, capital of the Tang Dynasty (China), becomes the largest city of the world, taking the lead from Ctesiphon, capital of Persia.
 Queen Seondeok of Silla (Korea) builds an astronomical observatory near Gyeongju (Cheomseongdae), one of the oldest in East Asia. 
 King Songtsän Gampo builds the first palace on the site of the Potala Palace in Lhasa (Tibet).

 By topic 
 Religion 
 The Muslims replace Zoroastrianism with Islam in Mesopotamia (later Iraq); they do not force their conquered subjects to embrace the Islamic faith, but they do require acceptance of the Quran as the doctrine of divine teaching, and will oblige their subjects to learn Arabic (approximate date).

Births

Deaths 
 Andreas of Caesarea, bishop and writer (b. 563)
 Congal Cáech, high king of Dál nAraidi (Ireland)
 John Athalarichos, illegitimate son of Heraclius
 Maria al-Qibtiyya, concubine of Muhammad
 Mo Chua, Irish bishop and founder of Balla
 Mo Chutu, Irish abbot and founder of Lismore Abbey
 Rostam Farrokhzād, Persian general (or 636)
 Wen Yanbo, chancellor of the Tang Dynasty (b. 575)

References

Sources